Jalen Berger is an American football running back for the Michigan State Spartans. He previously played for the Wisconsin Badgers.

High school career
A native of Newark, New Jersey, Berger attended Don Bosco Preparatory High School in Ramsey, New Jersey. As a senior, he rushed 840 yards with 12 touchdowns and added 27 receptions for 357 yards and four touchdowns. Berger was selected to play in the 2020 All-American Bowl. He committed to the University of Wisconsin–Madison to play college football.

College career

Wisconsin 
As a true freshman at Wisconsin in 2020, Berger played in four games and made one start. He led the team with 301 yards on 60 carries with two touchdowns. Berger played in only three games in 2021, before being dismissed from the team. He finished the year with 88 yards on 24 carries with a touchdown.

Michigan State 
After his dismissal, Berger transferred to Michigan State University. He entered the 2022 season splitting carries with fellow transfer, Jarek Broussard.

References

External links
Michigan state Spartans bio

Living people
Don Bosco Preparatory High School alumni
Players of American football from Newark, New Jersey
American football running backs
Wisconsin Badgers football players
Michigan State Spartans football players
Year of birth missing (living people)